TeleMation Inc. was a company specializing in products for the television industry, post-production and film industry, located in Salt Lake City, Utah. TeleMation started with a line of black-and-white video equipment, and later manufactured color video products. Lyle Keys was the founder and president of TeleMation, Inc., started in the late 1960s. Early equipment was for the B&W broadcast, cable television, and CCTV market.

History
In 1954, Lyle Oscar Keys was an itinerant equipment salesman from Wibaux, Montana. John F. Fitzpatrick was president of The Salt Lake Tribune at the time. Fitzpatrick's assistant John W. Gallivan hired Keys as an engineer for KUTV Channel 2, of which the Tribune was part owner. In a time when the electronics industry was burgeoning, Keys knew how to get essential parts fast in a time when these parts were unavailable or slow to get.  By 1962, the Tribunes owner, Kearns-Tribune Corporation, and their partners in KUTV organized Electronic Sales Corporation (ELCO) to help meet these needs. Keys was installed as president with an office in the Kearns Building in Salt Lake City. 

Within eight years, the company, which had been incorporated as Telemation, had 420 employees, producing and marketing 156 products for the television industry with annual sales of $10 million. It became the nation's largest supplier of closed circuit TV systems and developed scores of proprietary items for cable television, industrial, educational and commercial TV. 

Keys personally conceptualized many of the firm's products, helped engineer them, produced millions of dollars in sales, and even wrote Telemation's news releases and advertising copy.

The Kearns-Tribune Corporation's interest in this publicly owned enterprise as of early 1971 was twenty-four and one-half percent.

In 1977, TeleMation inc. became a division of Bell and Howell.
In October 1979, Bell and Howell entered a joint venture with Robert Bosch GmbH, Bosch's Fernseh Division, called Fernseh Inc. Bosch Fernseh Division was located in Darmstadt, Germany and for many years manufactured a full line of video and film equipment, professional video camera, VTR and Telecine, under Robert Bosch Fernsehanlagen GmbH.
In April 1982, Bosch fully acquired Fernseh Inc., renaming the company Robert Bosch Corporation, Fernseh Division.
In 1986, Bosch entered into a new joint venture with Philips Broadcast in Breda, Netherlands. This new company was called Broadcast Television Systems Inc. (BTS). Philips had been in the broadcast market for many years with a line of Norelco professional video cameras and other products.
In 1995, Philips Electronics North America Corp. fully acquired BTS Inc., renaming it Philips Broadcast - Philips Digital Video Systems.
In March 2001, this division was sold to Thomson SA, the current owner; the division was called Thomson Multimedia.
In 2002, the French electronics giant Thomson SA also acquired the Grass Valley Group from Tektronix in Beaverton, Oregon, US.
Grass Valley was sold to Belden on February 6, 2014. Belden also owns Miranda.

Products
Various Telemation B&W video products
TSE-200 Special Effects Generator
TPC-100 Porta-Studio
TMV-529 Waveform Sampler
TMV-708 Camera Control Unit
TMC 2100 Camera
TVM-650  Multicaster Switcher - vision mixer
TMM-203  Film Chain-Multiplexer - Film Island
TMU-100  Uniplexers
TVM-550 video distribution amplifier
TPA-550 Pulse distribution amplifier
AP C.A.T.V. Character Generators (using Teletype machine & video camera) (1965)
 A line of Character Generators
 Automation equipment, like the BCS 2000
 Digital Noise Reducer, also called Digital Noise Filter, 1984
TVU-175 Ventilation Unit
 Some color products (made in Salt Lake City under various brands)
TVS-1000 TAS-1000 routers and line of party line control panels
 Phone remote router control interface
MCS 2000 Master Control Switch - vision mixer
MC Machine Control
TSG-550 Sync Generator
Tmt-101 Stairstep Generator
Tmt-102 Multiburst Generator
Tmt-103 Sin Pulse/Window Generator
Compositor character generator
TCF-3000 Color film chain-Multiplexer - Film Island
Digital Encoder Pal and NTSC
Mach One Editor (acquired) - a Non-linear editing system
Alamar Automation (acquired)
TVS-2000 router and line of party line Control panels with and w/o mnemonic displays
CE 2200 party line controller, CE 2500
Status Display
TVS-3000 router
Venus router
BCS 3000 HP UNIX Based controller - VG 3000 VGS card
Jupiter Controller - Windows-based router control system
VM 3000 VGA Status Display, V board
SC 3000 Serial Control Interface S board
CE 3000 Matrix Controller, M board - can support 3 level switching and other brands
ES 3000 ESnet Interface
PL 3000 party line Controller
SI 3000 Control Processor
Jupiter Control panels: CP 3200, CP 3300, CP 3310, CP 3320
Jupiter XPress, CM4000
Trinix router, DM–33100
Saturn Master Control Switch
Weather Channel 97
Mars
SDR–400
GS–400
FGS 4000 3D Character – Graphic Generator - Computer-generated imagery
Vidifont Character generator (acquired from Thomson SA)
The Media Pool - disk recorder

Trivia
Fernseh is German for "television". In German the words fern and seh literally mean "far" and "see", respectively.

Because of all the mergers, customers sometimes fondly called these company(ies): Tele-bella-bosch-a-mation.

Thomson still operates offices in the cities of all these acquisitions:
 Cergy, France (Thomson World Headquarters)
 Salt Lake City, Utah, US - from TeleMation Inc
 Beaverton, Oregon, US - from Tektronix
 Nevada City, California, US - from  Grassvalley Group
 Breda, the Netherlands - from Philips-Norelco
 Weiterstadt - Darmstadt, Germany - from Bosch Fernseh

Awards:
Outstanding Achievement in Technical/Engineering Development Awards from National Academy of Televisio Arts and Sciences
1966-1967: Plumbicon Tube - N.V. Philips
1987-1888: FGS 4000 computer animation system - BTS - SLC, UT
1992-1993: Prism Technology for Color Television Cameras - N.V. Philips
1993-1994: Controlled Edge Enhancement Utilizing Skin Hue KeyingBTS and Ikegami (joint award)
1997-1998: Development of a High Resolution Digital Film Scanner Eastman Kodak and Philips Germany
2000-2001: Pioneering developments in shared video-data storage systems for use in television video servers - Thomson/Philips - SLC, UT
2002-2003: Technology to simultaneously encode multiple video qualities and the corresponding metadata to enable real-time conformance and / or playout of the higher quality video (nominally broadcast) based on the decisions made using the lower quality proxiesMontage. Philips and Thomson.

Telemation Productions
Telemation Productions was a post-production house in Seattle, Washington; Chicago, Illinois; Phoenix, Arizona; and Denver, Colorado in the 1970s and early 80s. Offices were sold or closed in the late 1980s. 

Telemation Productions was started as a marketing tool by Telemation Inc. in the early 1970s.  It started as a single office located in Glenview, Illinois, a suburb of Chicago.  In 1978, a second office was opened in Denver.  Also in 1978, the television equipment manufacturing operation was sold to Bell & Howell.  At that time, Telemation Inc. owned only the two production facilities and the manufacturing building in Salt Lake City, which was leased to Bell & Howell.  In 1979 Telemation acquired a production facility in Seattle and renamed it Telemation Productions.  In the early 1980s, Telemation acquired a facility in Phoenix, also renaming it Telemation Productions. In the early 1980s, Telemation Productions added a distribution division located in Chicago which provided duplication and shipping services to advertising agencies and a mobile division equipped with a television remote truck. Telemation Productions ownership changed in 1987 and again in 1990, with the Home Shopping Network buying the company. The Phoenix office and distribution division were sold in 1989 prior to this acquisition. The remote truck was sold in 1990.  The Seattle office was closed in 1991, the Chicago office was closed in 1993, and the Denver office was closed the following year.

External links
Remembering TeleMation, Inc.
Thomson takeover
 Robert Bosch Fernseh
 Philips
 Thomson Grassvalley
  Times, A.P. at Home, Aug. 6, 1965.

References

 TeleMation to B&H
 BTS: Philips and Bosch
 Noise filter
 Robert Bosch Fernseh Division
 BTS
 Bosch BTS PDF, Page 15
 Telecine
 TM camera

Electronics companies of the United States
Film and video technology
Technicolor SA
Manufacturing companies based in Salt Lake City
1962 establishments in Utah